United Bank may refer to:

 United Bank of Albania
 United Bank of India
 United Bank for Africa (Kenya)
 United Bank for Africa, Nigeria
 United Bank Limited, Pakistan
 United Bank of Switzerland (UBS)
 United Bank for Africa (Uganda)
 United Bank (Atlanta metropolitan area), Georgia, U.S.
 United Bank (West Virginia), U.S.
 United Bank of Arizona, acquired by Citibank, then Norwest

See also